Acanthinopus gibbosus is an extinct species of shrimp placed in its own genus, Acanthinopus, which has not been assigned to a family. It was found in Norian (Upper Triassic) sediments of the Zorzino Limestone in northern Italy.

References

Caridea
Triassic crustaceans
Fossils of Italy
Monotypic crustacean genera